The 1986 Nebraska Cornhuskers football team represented the University of Nebraska–Lincoln in the 1986 NCAA Division I-A football season. The team was coached by Tom Osborne and played their home games in Memorial Stadium in Lincoln, Nebraska.

Schedule

Roster and coaching staff

Depth chart

Game summaries

Florida State

This was the first ever night game at Memorial Stadium.  Nebraska's loss to FSU in Lincoln the previous year was avenged when the Cornhuskers came back from a halftime deficit, outscoring FSU 24-3 and holding the Seminoles to -2 yards in the second half.

Illinois

The outcome of this game was more or less sealed from the very first play, as Illinois QB Chris Lamb threw an interception that Cornhusker CB Brian Davis returned for a touchdown, and Nebraska never looked back.

Oregon

Oregon made the first strike, but Nebraska then ran away from the Ducks, scoring 48 unanswered points, though the Cornhuskers suffered the loss of WB Von Sheppard to injury and saw PK Dale Klein's consecutive PATs streak ended at 60.

South Carolina

Nebraska survived a scare in Columbia, escaping with a victory due to recovering a Gamecock fumble with two minutes left to play to set up the go-ahead touchdown, and then intercepting a throw by South Carolina QB Todd Ellis at NU's 10 yard line with just 10 seconds remaining.

Oklahoma State

Nebraska continued their string of domination over Oklahoma State in the second ever night game at Memorial Stadium, extending their win streak over the Cowboys to 25.

Missouri

Missouri scored first on a 29-yard field goal, but Nebraska owned the show for the rest of the game, scoring six straight touchdowns on their way to the win.  Nebraska PK Dave Klein beat the Cornhusker career FG record of 22 when he extended his total to 24 in this game.

Colorado

Unranked Colorado stunned the #3 Cornhuskers, holding Nebraska to its lowest rushing yard total in eight years and ending Nebraska's 18-year winning streak against the Buffaloes.

Kansas State

The hapless Wildcats suffered Nebraska's wrath following their loss to unranked Colorado the week prior, as the Cornhuskers romped in the snow at Memorial Stadium and shut out Kansas State while allowing them just 106 total yards of offense.

Iowa State

Nebraska struck first but then seemed to flame out, as Iowa State sent the Cornhuskers to the locker room behind 14-7 at halftime.  After a rousing pep talk from Coach Osborne, the Cornhuskers stormed back in the 2nd half for the win.

Kansas

Oklahoma

The #5 Cornhuskers, flying high after their 70-0 shutout against Kansas the previous week, looked ready to upset the #3 Sooners, but it was not to be.  Oklahoma found the end zone twice in the 4th quarter to tie the game, and forced a Nebraska punt with 1:22 remaining.  After grinding back down the field, and with just 9 seconds remaining, Oklahoma PK Tim Lashar made a 31-yard kick to split the uprights for the win, handing the Sooners their 2nd consecutive Big 8 Championship title.

LSU

Nebraska's 25th bowl appearance saw the Blackshirts setting two new bowl-game records by holding LSU to just 32 net rushing yards and 10 first downs as the #6 Cornhuskers rolled up the win over the #5 Tigers.

Rankings

Awards

NFL and pro players
The following Nebraska players who participated in the 1986 season later moved on to the next level and joined a professional or semi-pro team as draftees or free agents.

References

Nebraska
Nebraska Cornhuskers football seasons
Sugar Bowl champion seasons
Nebraska Cornhuskers football